Molio'o Pouli Setu (died 8 September 1959) was a Western Samoan chief and politician. He served as a member of the Legislative Assembly between 1948 and 1951.

Biography
A member of the Fono of Faipule, Setu was selected as the Samoan representative for Va'a-o-Fonoti when the Legislative Assembly was established in 1948. However, he failed to be re-elected in the 1951 elections. He also served as a district judge, and represented

He married Tu'iemanu Manu'a. Their daughter Lili Tunu married Malietoa Tanumafili II in 1940. He died on 8 September 1959 at the age of 70, leaving six children.

References

Samoan judges
Samoan chiefs
Members of the Legislative Assembly of Samoa
1959 deaths